Fasoula is a village in the Paphos District of Cyprus, located 10 km north of Kouklia.

References

Communities in Paphos District